The 15th Los Angeles Film Critics Association Awards were announced on 16 December 1989 and given on 16 January 1990.

Winners
Best Picture:
Do the Right Thing
Runner-up: Drugstore Cowboy
Best Director:
Spike Lee - Do the Right Thing
Runner-up: Oliver Stone – Born on the Fourth of July
Best Actor:
Daniel Day-Lewis – My Left Foot
Runner-up: Morgan Freeman – Lean on Me, Johnny Handsome, Glory and Driving Miss Daisy
Best Actress (tie):
Andie MacDowell – Sex, Lies, and Videotape
Michelle Pfeiffer – The Fabulous Baker Boys
Best Supporting Actor:
Danny Aiello – Do the Right Thing
Runner-up: Martin Landau – Crimes and Misdemeanors
Best Supporting Actress:
Brenda Fricker – My Left Foot
Runner-up: Anjelica Huston – Enemies, a Love Story
Best Screenplay:
Gus Van Sant and Daniel Yost – Drugstore Cowboy
Runner-up: Spike Lee - Do the Right Thing
Best Cinematography:
Michael Ballhaus – The Fabulous Baker Boys
Runner-up: Robert Richardson – Born on the Fourth of July
Best Music Score:
Bill Lee – Do the Right Thing
Runner-up: Elliot Goldenthal – Drugstore Cowboy
Best Foreign Film (tie):
Distant Voices, Still Lives • UK
Story of Women (Une affaire de femmes) • France
Best Non-Fiction Film:
Roger & Me
Runner-up: The Emperor's Naked Army Marches On (Yuki Yukite shingun)
Best Animation:
The Little Mermaid
Experimental/Independent Film/Video Award:
Gregg Araki – The Long Weekend (O' Despair)
New Generation Award:
Laura San Giacomo – Sex, Lies, and Videotape
Career Achievement Award:
Stanley Donen
Special Citation:
The Margaret Herrick Library of the Academy of Motion Picture Arts and Sciences

References

External links
15th Annual Los Angeles Film Critics Association Awards

1989
Los Angeles Film Critics Association Awards
Los Angeles Film Critics Association Awards
Los Angeles Film Critics Association Awards
Los Angeles Film Critics Association Awards